The Minister of Territorial Cohesion (French: Ministre de la Cohésion territoriale) is a cabinet member in the Government of France, in charge of spatial planning and housing. The current officeholder is Joël Giraud of La République En Marche! (LREM).

The position has frequently been combined with the portfolios of Public Works (Équipement), Transportation (Transports), Tourism (Tourisme) and the Sea (Mer). The ministry had merged with the Ministry of Ecology, Energy, Sustainable Development and Territorial Development upon the election of Nicolas Sarkozy as President of France. In 2009, it has been separated from the Ecology Ministry and has taken the name of Ministry of Rural Areas and Spatial Planning.

Ministers of Territorial Development (1972–present)
 12 July 1972 – 28 May 1974: Olivier Guichard
 29 March 1977 – 26 September 1977: Jean-Pierre Fourcade
 26 September 1977 – 22 May 1981: Fernand Icart
 22 May 1981 – 22 March 1983: Michel Rocard
 17 July 1984 – 20 March 1986: Gaston Defferre
 20 March 1986 – 10 May 1988: Pierre Méhaignerie
 15 May 1991 – 2 April 1992: Michel Delebarre
 29 March 1993 – 18 May 1995: Charles Pasqua
 18 May 1995 – 7 November 1995: Bernard Pons
 7 November 1995 – 4 June 1997: Jean-Claude Gaudin
 4 July 1997 – 10 July 2001: Dominique Voynet
 10 July 2001 – 7 May 2002: Yves Cochet
 7 May 2002 – 31 March 2004: Jean-Paul Delevoye
 31 March 2004 – 31 May 2005: Gilles de Robien
 3 June 2005 – 23 June 2009: Hubert Falco, as Secretary of State for Territorial Development
 23 June 2009 – 16 May 2012: Michel Mercier, as Minister of Rural Areas and Spatial Planning
 16 May 2012 – 2 April 2014: Cécile Duflot, as Minister of Territorial Equality and Housing
 2 April 2014 – 11 February 2016: Sylvia Pinel, as Minister of Territorial Equality and Housing
 11 February 2016 – 10 May 2017: Jean-Michel Baylet, as Minister of Spatial Planning, Rurality and Territorial Communities, served with Emmanuelle Cosse, as Minister of Housing and Territorial Development
 17 May 2017 – 19 June 2017: Richard Ferrand, as Minister of Territorial Cohesion
 19 June 2017 – 16 October 2018: Jacques Mézard, as Minister of Territorial Cohesion
 16 October 2018 – 5 March 2022: Jacqueline Gourault as Minister of Territorial Cohesion and Relations with Local Authorities
 5 March 2022 – 20 May 2022 : Joël Giraud as Minister of Territorial Cohesion and Relations with Local Authorities
 20 May 2022 - 4 July 2022 : Christophe Béchu as Minister of Territorial Cohesion and Relations with Local Authorities
 4 July 2022 - present : Christophe Béchu as Minister of Ecological Transition and Territorial Cohesion and Caroline Cayeux as Minister of Relations with Local Authorities

References

See also
Minister in charge of Housing (France)

Territorial development
France